Alfred Seymour MP, JP (11 November 1824 – 15 March 1888), of Knoyle House, East Knoyle, Wiltshire, and of Trent, Dorset, was a British Liberal Party politician.

Background
He was a son of Henry Seymour of Knoyle House, Wiltshire, of Trent and of Northbrook and wife Jane Hopkinson, and brother of Henry Danby Seymour of Trent.

Career
He was elected as a Member of Parliament (MP) for Totnes at a by-election in January 1863, and held the seat until the borough was disenfranchised in 1868. He returned to the House of Commons the following year, when he was elected at a by-election for Salisbury, and held that seat until his defeat at the 1874 general election.

Seymour was also a Justice of the Peace. He succeeded in Knoyle House, Wiltshire, in 1863.

Family
He married on 18 August 1866 Isabella Leighton (d. 7 April 1911), daughter of Sir Baldwyn Leighton, 8th Baronet, and wife, and widow of Beriah Botfield of Hopton Court, Shropshire, Member of Parliament, and had one daughter: 
Jane Margaret Seymour (14 March 1873 – 5 August 1943), unmarried and without issue

References

External links

1824 births
1888 deaths
Alfred Seymour, of Knoyle House, Wiltshire, and of Trent
Liberal Party (UK) MPs for English constituencies
UK MPs 1859–1865
UK MPs 1865–1868
UK MPs 1868–1874